The Chifeng–Kazuo high-speed railway (also referred to in Chinese as the Chika high-speed railway) is a double-track electrified railway connecting Chifeng, Inner Mongolia and Kazuo Station of the Beijing–Shenyang high-speed railway. The line passes through Harqin Zuoyi Mongol Autonomous County and Jianping County, both administered by Chaoyang City. It then passes into areas administered by Chifeng: Ningcheng County and Pingzhuang town of Yuanbaoshan District to the existing Chifeng station (formerly known as Chifeng West station) on the Beijing–Tongliao railway. The main line has a total length of 157 kilometres and the target design speed is 250 kilometres per hour. A connecting curve to the Beijing–Shenyang high-speed railway on the west side of Kazuo station to/from Beijing is proposed. The railway was built in the second half of 2016 and joint commissioning and testing began on April 1, 2020. It was officially opened for operation on June 30, 2020.

References

High-speed railway lines in China
Standard gauge railways in China
Rail transport in Inner Mongolia
Rail transport in Liaoning
Railway lines opened in 2020